Rick Jones (born November 17, 1952) is a Republican politician from Michigan who served in the Michigan Senate for two terms in the 24th district, after having served three terms in the Michigan House of Representatives.

Prior to his election to the Legislature, Jones served one term as the Eaton County Sheriff and had spent 31 years with the sheriff's department.

References

1952 births
Living people
Republican Party members of the Michigan House of Representatives
Republican Party Michigan state senators
Michigan sheriffs
People from Battle Creek, Michigan
People from Grand Ledge, Michigan
Michigan State University alumni
21st-century American politicians